Sir John Cotton (1512/13 – 21 April 1593), of Cheveley and Landwade, Cambridgeshire, was an English politician.

Family
Cotton was the first surviving son of Sir Robert Cotton of Landwade.  He married Isobel Spencer (died 1578), daughter of Sir William Spencer of Althorp. The Cottons had eight sons, including the MP, John Cotton, and five daughters.

Career
He was a Member (MP) of the Parliament of England for Cambridgeshire in October 1553 and November 1554 and was selected High Sheriff of Cambridgeshire and Huntingdonshire for 1549–50 and  1556–57. He was knighted in 1553.

References

1513 births
1593 deaths
English knights
People from Cambridgeshire
English MPs 1553 (Mary I)
English MPs 1554–1555
High Sheriffs of Cambridgeshire and Huntingdonshire